Lodderia eumorpha is a species of minute sea snail or micromollusc, a marine gastropod mollusc in the family Skeneidae.

Description
The height of the shell attains 1.3 mm, its diameter 1.7 mm. The very small, umbilicate shell has a turbinate shape. It is white and translucent. It is distantly ribbed, and radiately striate. The sculpture consists of 5 prominent spiral riblets, the first just above the periphery. There is a low and indistinct spiral riblet on the body whorl outside the suture, and  sometimes a fine riblet bordering the funnel-shaped umbilicus. The radiate sculpture is formed by distinct threads, which are equidistant and slightly directed backward, with their interstices wider than the threads. The spire is depressed conoidal. lower than the aperture. The minute protoconch is spherical and contains one whorl only. The three whorls of the teleoconch increase regularly. They are convex, the last flattened between the suture and the first spiral riblet. The periphery is rounded. The base of the shell is convex. The suture is impressed. The circular aperture is oblique. The peristome is continuous, smooth inside and ornamented outside by the spiral sculpture. The strong columella is arcuate and not reflexed. The deep umbilicus is rather narrow.

Distribution
This marine species is endemic to New Zealand.

Subspecies
 Lodderia eumorpha cookiana (Dell, 1952)
 Lodderia eumorpha eumorpha (Suter, 1908)

References

 Powell A. W. B., New Zealand Mollusca, William Collins Publishers Ltd, Auckland, New Zealand 1979 
 Spencer, H.G.; Marshall, B.A.; Maxwell, P.A.; Grant-Mackie, J.A.; Stilwell, J.D.; Willan, R.C.; Campbell, H.J.; Crampton, J.S.; Henderson, R.A.; Bradshaw, M.A.; Waterhouse, J.B.; Pojeta, J. Jr (2009). Phylum Mollusca: chitons, clams, tusk shells, snails, squids, and kin, in: Gordon, D.P. (Ed.) (2009). New Zealand inventory of biodiversity: 1. Kingdom Animalia: Radiata, Lophotrochozoa, Deuterostomia. pp. 161–254.

eumorpha
Gastropods of New Zealand
Gastropods described in 1908